Lego Harry Potter: Years 5–7 is a Lego-themed action-adventure video game developed by Traveller's Tales and published by Warner Bros. Interactive Entertainment. Released on 11 November 2011 in North America and November 18 in Europe, the game is based on the Lego Harry Potter toy line and is based on the final three books and four films in the Harry Potter film series: Harry Potter and the Order of the Phoenix, Harry Potter and the Half-Blood Prince, Harry Potter and the Deathly Hallows – Part 1, and Harry Potter and the Deathly Hallows – Part 2. The game was released for the PlayStation 3, Xbox 360, PlayStation Portable, PlayStation Vita, Wii, Nintendo DS, Nintendo 3DS, Microsoft Windows, iOS and Android. The first of three trailers was released 6 October 2011, and the demo was released on 1 November.

The game was released on Steam on 5 January 2012. The OS X version of the game was released by Feral Interactive on 22 March 2012. A mobile version of the game was released in May 2012 and September 2016 for iOS and Android, respectively. The game was released for the PlayStation 4 on 21 October 2016, as part of the Lego Harry Potter Collection, which bundles the game with its predecessor, Lego Harry Potter: Years 1–4 and was also released for the Nintendo Switch and Xbox One on 30 October 2018.

The game received generally positive reviews, especially to the humor added to the game's narrative.

Gameplay

Lego Harry Potter: Years 5–7s basis gameplay follows the standards of that of the previous game as adapted to the story of the last three books and four films, covering a wide range of new characters, locations and items. The online play feature that appeared in Lego Harry Potter Years 1–4 is absent from the PS3 and Xbox 360 versions of this game. Some additional quality of life changes was made, such as Wingardium Leviosa (for building and moving certain objects) no longer needing the spell to be selected to do said features.

Development
Directly after Years 1–4 was announced, it was speculated that a Years 5-7 would be released in the near future. It was actually revealed to be planned for a holiday 2011 release on 19 May 2011 by an announcement by Warner Bros. and TT Games. In the instruction booklet for various Lego Harry Potter 2011 sets, a page shows an ad for the game with Harry and Voldemort having a climactic duel (Harry casting Expelliarmus and Voldemort shouting Avada Kedavra, a scene from the final book/movie). During an exclusive gameplay session with TT Games, it was announced that there would be an iOS version to be released on the iTunes App Store later that same year. The cover art for the game was released on 1 September 2011. A few days after, they released a trailer featuring Voldemort and Bellatrix. Those two, and a third, are available on the official site.

The game was released on the Mac App Store on 22 March 2012. On 3 May 2012, an iOS port of the DS game was released. This version was ported to Android on 28 September 2016.

Reception

The console versions of the game received generally positive reviews, while the handheld versions received mixed reviews. Review aggregator website Metacritic gave the game wildly different scores dependent on platform, with the PC version scoring the best at 80%, meaning "generally favorable reviews". Metacritic also gave the PlayStation Vita version a score of 64%, meaning "mixed or average reviews".

Justin Davis of IGN gave Lego Harry Potter: Years 5–7 an 8 out of 10. He praised the humorous cutscenes, the use of the film's music tracks, the amount of gameplay available after the main adventure is cleared, and that the "game is simple enough for anyone to pick up and play." Neil Davey from United Kingdom newspaper The Guardian scored the game at 4 stars from 5, saying "there's weeks of fun in this package."

References

External links

Lego Harry Potter: Years 5–7 (YouTube)

3D platform games
2011 video games
Double Eleven (company) games
Feral Interactive games
Games for Windows certified games
Harry Potter video games
IOS games
Harry Potter: Years 5-7
MacOS games
Nintendo 3DS games
Nintendo DS games
PlayStation 3 games
PlayStation 4 games
PlayStation 4 Pro enhanced games
PlayStation Portable games
PlayStation Vita games
Traveller's Tales games
Video games based on adaptations
Video games developed in the United Kingdom
Video game sequels
Video games set in 1995
Video games set in 1996
Video games set in 1997
Video games set in 1998
Video games set in 2017
Video games set in castles
Video games set in England
Video games set in London
Video games set in Scotland
Video games set in the 1990s
Warner Bros. video games
Werewolf video games
Wii games
Windows games
Xbox 360 games
Multiplayer and single-player video games